Loly may refer to:

 Loly Aivirrne, a fictional character from the Bleach anime/manga universe
 Loly Rico (21st century), Salvadoran-Canadian activist

See also
 Lolly (disambiguation)